Jamie Quinn is a Scottish actor and musician. He is best known for his roles as Private Kevin "Mac" McDowell in Bluestone 42, Fergie in  Still Game and Ian Baird in Two Doors Down. He is the singer-songwriter and guitarist in the rock band Penny Mob.

Early life 

Quinn was born in Glasgow, Scotland and grew up in Coatbridge, North Lanarkshire. He attended St. Ambrose High School in Coatbridge. He was given the nickname "Penny Chew" whilst at school due to the fact that he had appeared in a TV advert for S1jobs where he stood at an ice cream van and delivered the line "Just a penny chew then Mr.".

He trained at the Drama Centre London.

Career 

Quinn began his career playing the role of Fergie in the BBC One sitcom Still Game, a role which he played for seven series.

On stage, he appeared in the role of Fraz in the Olivier Award-winning production of Black Watch (play) with the National Theatre of Scotland, at the Barbican Centre, London and St. Ann's Warehouse, New York.

From 2013 to 2015, Quinn starred in the BBC Three comedy Bluestone 42, playing the role of Private Kevin "Mac" McDowell.

In 2014 he appeared in "Still Game: Live" at The SSE Hydro.

He played George "Spanky" Farrell, a 1950's working class Teddy Boy, in the 2015 revival of the classic play "The Slab Boys" (the first in The Slab Boys Trilogy) at the Citizens Theatre, Glasgow, directed by David Hayman and designed by playwright and artist John Byrne.

Since 2015, Quinn has played the role of Ian Baird in the BBC Two sitcom Two Doors Down.

In 2017 he appeared in the Michael Winterbottom film "On The Road", alongside the British Rock band Wolf Alice. The film premiered at the BFI London Film Festival.

In 2018, Quinn starred in the Karen Gillan directed feature The Party's Just Beginning. It premiered at the Glasgow Film Festival. In the same year, Quinn also voiced the cook Thorn in the French-British animated series Lilybuds. The series was produced by Zodiak Kids and was shown in several countries including France, the UK, Canada, Latin America and the Middle East.

Quinn is the singer-songwriter and guitarist in the Alternative rock band Penny Mob.

References

External links 
 

Year of birth missing (living people)
Living people
Scottish male film actors
Scottish male television actors
Male actors from Glasgow
Alumni of the Drama Centre London
Scottish male soap opera actors
Scottish male child actors